Anjli Mohindra (born 20 February 1990) is a British stage, screen and voice-over actress and writer. She is best known for playing aspiring journalist Rani Chandra in the Doctor Who spin-off series The Sarah Jane Adventures (2008–2011) and would-be suicide bomber Nadia Ali in the hit BBC One political thriller Bodyguard (2018). Her other television roles include Surgeon Lieutenant Tiffany Docherty in the BBC One police procedural Vigil (2021), Detective Constable Josie Chancellor in the ITV crime drama Dark Heart (2016–2018) and Archie in the Sky science fiction thriller The Lazarus Project (2022).

Early life
Mohindra was born on 20 February 1990 in London. She grew up in West Bridgford, Nottinghamshire, apart from a four-year period on a military base in Germany, where she was the only ethnic minority child out of 2,000 students at an Armed Forces school. According to Mohindra, her parents are both Hindu in terms of religion, Indian in terms of origin and Punjabi in terms of language and culture. Her father was raised in Kenya when it was a British colony and had a clerical job in the British Army for several years. Her mother arrived in the UK from Punjab, India at 18, to further her education, and worked variously as a court clerk, bank manager, postmistress, pub owner and English tutor.

She has a sister and a brother. In a 2018 interview about her personal style, Mohindra said that she had been a tomboy growing up, sometimes wearing her brother's hand-me-down clothes.

Mohindra attended Jesse Gray Primary School and West Bridgford School. She later trained in acting at the Central Junior Television Workshop in Nottingham.

Career

2005–2011: Early career 
Mohindra's television acting career began in an episode of ITV's long-running soap opera Coronation Street in 2005, where she played Dev Alahan's daughter Shareen after being turned down for another, larger role. This appearance was soon followed by small, one-episode parts in the medical soap opera Doctors (2006), teen sitcom The Inbetweeners (2008), police procedural Law & Order: UK (2009) and medical drama Holby City (2010). She also appeared in two episodes of the comedy drama Beaver Falls (2011).

Mohindra played her first regular role as aspiring journalist Rani Chandra in the Doctor Who spin-off series The Sarah Jane Adventures (2008–2011) on children's television channel CBBC, where her character was a few years younger than her. She was introduced in the second series as a replacement for Yasmin Paige, who left the series due to her wanting to complete her GCSEs. Mohindra continued to play the role in the subsequent three series until the very last episode of the show, which premiered in October 2011. She appeared in 41 episodes overall, including those featuring David Tennant as the Tenth Doctor, Matt Smith as the Eleventh Doctor and actors from the original Doctor Who series, broadcast from 1963 to 1989, Nicholas Courtney and Katy Manning.

2012–present: Post-The Sarah Jane Adventures career 

In 2012, Mohindra appeared in an episode of the longest-running medical drama series in the world, Casualty. Soon after, she landed parts in two episodes of The Missing (2014), a BAFTA and Golden Globe-nominated child-abduction thriller starring Tchéky Karyo, and six episodes of Cucumber (2015), Russell T Davies's series about a middle-aged gay man from Manchester.

Mohindra played a leading role in four 15-minute episodes of the BBC iPlayer original romcom My Jihad (2014–2015), described as "a tender and funny love story exploring the unfolding relationship between a young Muslim couple". She then made her feature film debut in Miss You Already (2015), starring Toni Collette and Drew Barrymore, followed by supporting roles in two popular ITV shows, Paranoid (2016) and Bancroft (2017).

Mohindra's highest profile role was as the duplicitous Nadia Ali in the multi-BAFTA, Emmy and Golden Globe-nominated Bodyguard, Jed Mercurio's political thriller that gripped British television viewers in 2018. The series finale became the most-watched BBC drama in 10 years. Mohindra initially declined the role until she learned there would be more depth to her character than she assumed. The same year, she starred alongside Tom Riley in the ITV crime drama Dark Heart and guested in DC's Legends of Tomorrow as magical shapeshifter Charlie. Showing a talent for the macabre, Mohindra then starred as an ambitious radio producer in Mark Gatiss's take on the classic Christmas ghost story, The Dead Room (2018), alongside Simon Callow.

From 2006 to 2019, she played in 11 theatrical productions. Her stage work includes David Hare's Behind the Beautiful Forevers (2014) and Shahid Nadeem's Dara (2015), both professionally recorded and broadcast through National Theatre Live, as well as Oscar Wilde's The Importance of Being Earnest (2012) and Michael Frayn's Noises Off (2019).

In 2019, Mohindra appeared as a regular lead in the ITV drama Wild Bill, starring opposite Hollywood legend Rob Lowe. She later played the Queen of the Skithra in the Doctor Who episode "Nikola Tesla's Night of Terror" (2020). Since 2022, Mohindra has also reprised her role of Rani from The Sarah Jane Adventures in several Doctor Who audio drama spin-offs from Big Finish Productions, as well as in three episodes of Doctor Who: Redacted (2022), a ten-part podcast drama from BBC Sounds featuring the Thirteenth Doctor, played by Jodie Whittaker. Fans of the classic Doctor Who series are also quite familiar with Mohindra's voice, as she has portrayed many other characters in audio dramas featuring the Fifth, Sixth and Eighth Doctors over the years.

Mohindra has made strides to develop her voice as a writer, winning a place on the Royal Court's Young Writers' Programme in 2016. In the midst of the COVID-19 pandemic, she made her writing debut with a short film called The People Under the Moon (2020), produced entirely during lockdown and starring Gwilym Lee as a medic who joins a dating app.

In 2021, she appeared alongside Suranne Jones in Tom Edge's edge-of-the-seat thriller Vigil, playing Tiffany Docherty, the medical officer on board a nuclear submarine which becomes the subject of a murder investigation. The series quickly became the BBC's most-watched new drama of the year. The following year, she appeared in the Netflix period spy thriller Munich – The Edge of War as a British diplomatic secretary embroiled in the negotiations at the 1938 Munich conference and then had the lead role in the Sky science fiction drama The Lazarus Project, described as a "gripping exploration of memory, fate and the limits of love". In the series she played the mysterious Archie, who recruits Paapa Essiedu's character George into a secret organisation that has the power to turn back time if the world is threatened by extinction.

Filmography

Film

Television

Audio and radio dramas

Audiobook narration

Video games

References

External links

 

Living people
1990 births
21st-century English actresses
21st-century English women writers
21st-century English writers
Actresses from Nottinghamshire
British actresses of Indian descent
British Hindus
English people of Indian descent
English people of Punjabi descent
English television actresses
People from Edgware
People from West Bridgford
People educated at West Bridgford School
Audiobook narrators